The 2020–21 Omaha Mavericks men's ice hockey season was the 24th season of play for the program and the 8th in the NCHC conference. The Mavericks represented the University of Nebraska Omaha and were coached by Mike Gabinet, in his 4th season.

Season
As a result of the ongoing COVID-19 pandemic the entire college ice hockey season was delayed. Because the NCAA had previously announced that all winter sports athletes would retain whatever eligibility they possessed through at least the following year, none of Omaha's players would lose a season of play. However, the NCAA also approved a change in its transfer regulations that would allow players to transfer and play immediately rather than having to sit out a season, as the rules previously required.

Due to ongoing COVID-19 concerns, The entire NCHC conference began the season playing in Omaha, Nebraska. Despite playing all of these game in their home building, the Mavericks didn't officially play a home game in December. All games were considered 'neutral site' matches but Omaha was still able to use the familiar surroundings to get off to a good start. It took the Mavs a few games to get used to the compressed schedule but, by the end of the third week of play, the team had shot up into the middle of the top-20 rankings. UNO would hover around that point for the remainder of the regular season and, despite losing 3 out of 4 to North Dakota at the end, Omaha was projected to make the NCAA Tournament under normal circumstances.

When their conference tournament began, Omaha was hoping it could at least improve its standing and get a better matchup in late March. However, the team was outplayed by Denver for most of the contest and lost the quarterfinal 4–5. As a result, Omaha was ranked 14th by the selection committee and placed opposite to Minnesota in the regional semifinals. The Mavericks never really were in the game, surrendering the first three goals before ending the first down 1–3. The Gophers scored an additional trio in the second and then skated to a rather easy 7–2 win over Omaha.

Jacob Zab sat out the season.

Departures

Recruiting

Roster
As of March 1, 2021.

Standings

Schedule and results

|-
!colspan=12 style=";" | Regular season

|-
!colspan=12 style=";" | 

|-
!colspan=12 style=";" |

Scoring statistics

Goaltending statistics

Rankings

USCHO did not release a poll in week 20.

Awards and honors

Players drafted into the NHL

2021 NHL Entry Draft

† incoming freshman

References

Omaha Mavericks men's ice hockey seasons
Omaha Mavericks
Omaha Mavericks
Omaha Mavericks
Omaha Mavericks
Omaha Mavericks